Hyllisia pseudolineata is a species of beetle in the family Cerambycidae. It was described by Breuning in 1942.

References

pseudolineata
Beetles described in 1942
Taxa named by Stephan von Breuning (entomologist)